The American Conservation Coalition (ACC) is a 501(c)(4) nonprofit environmental advocacy organization focusing on limited-government, conservative approaches to environmental issues. The group was founded in Appleton, Wisconsin, in 2017.

History 
ACC was founded by Benji Backer in 2017 with the goal to add conservative voices to environmental conversations. However, since its founding, ACC has evolved to advocate for legislation at the federal level and educate students on environmental issues.

Issue advocacy 
ACC advocates for land and wildlife conservation, developments in clean energy and emission-reducing technology like carbon capture and sequestration (CCS), and other free-market environmental policies. ACC supports the development and deployment of nuclear energy,  renewable energy, biomass, geothermal energy, hydroelectric power; the ACC also supports the use of natural gas as a relatively low-carbon fuel during a transition phase away from higher carbon sources.

In April 2020, ACC released the American Climate Contract. The contract advocates climate-change related policies with bipartisan support, existing climate and environmental legislation in Congress, and free market principles. The Young Republicans National Federation, a national conservative organization, endorsed the plan.

References

External links 

Non-profit organizations based in the United States
Nature conservation organizations based in the United States
Environmental organizations established in 2017
Environmental organizations based in Wisconsin
Appleton, Wisconsin
501(c)(4) nonprofit organizations